Eucalyptus rostrata is  a scientific name that has been used for two plant species and is hence a synonym for: 
Eucalyptus robusta, swamp mahogany or swamp messmate
Eucalyptus camaldulensis, river red gum

rostrata